Shlyakhovo is a rural locality (a selo) and the administrative center of Shlyakhovskoye Rural Settlement, Korochansky District, Belgorod Oblast, Russia. The population was 238 as of 2010. There are 18 streets.

Geography 
Shlyakhovo is located 31 km southwest of Korocha (the district's administrative centre) by road. Melikhovo is the nearest rural locality.

References 

Rural localities in Korochansky District